Cardiocondyla minutior is a species of ant in the subfamily Myrmicinae. It is a widespread ant species, and not invasive in nature.

Distribution
New Zealand, Barbados, Costa Rica, Dominican Republic, Ecuador, Galapagos Islands, Greater Antilles, Guatemala, Honduras, Mexico, Guam, Hawaii, Indonesia, New Guinea, India, Nepal, Sri Lanka, Vietnam, Japan.

References

External links

 at antwiki.org
PIAkey

Myrmicinae
Hymenoptera of Asia
Insects described in 1899

Hymenoptera of New Zealand
Ants of New Zealand